The 2017–18 Notre Dame Fighting Irish women's basketball team represented the University of Notre Dame during the 2017–18 NCAA Division I women's basketball season. The Fighting Irish, led by thirty-first year head coach Muffet McGraw, played their home games at Edmund P. Joyce Center as members of the Atlantic Coast Conference. McGraw was inducted into the Basketball Hall of Fame at the start of the season. The Irish finished the season 35–3, 15–1 in ACC play to earn a share of the regular season championship. They defeated Virginia and Florida State before losing to Louisville in the ACC Women's Tournament championship. They received an at-large bid as the No. 1 seed in the Spokane region. They defeated Cal State Northridge and Villanova to advance to the Sweet Sixteen. There they defeated Texas A&M and Oregon to advance to the Final Four. After upsetting then-unbeaten Connecticut 91–89 in overtime in the Final Four, Notre Dame played Mississippi State in the national championship. The Irish edged the Bulldogs 61–58 by Arike Ogunbowale's three-pointer with 0.1 seconds left on the clock, capturing their second national title in 18 years. The Irish became the first team in NCAA Women's Basketball history to trail by double digits in both the semifinal and National Championship games and come back to win.

Despite the team's record, its appearance in the championship game was seen as surprising because of its severely depleted roster. Two players missed the entire season to torn ACLs, and two others were lost to the same injury in December; this rash of injuries left the Irish with only seven scholarship players. Brianna Turner, an All-American forward in 2016–17, was injured in the 2017 NCAA tournament; senior guard Mychal Johnson was lost in a preseason practice, freshman center Mikayla Vaughn only played 6 games; and starting senior point guard Lili Thompson was lost on New Year's Eve. Before the championship game, McGraw told media, "I didn't think we'd have more ACL tears than losses. I think it's just an amazing accomplishment for this team and the resilience they've shown all year."

Offseason

Departures

Roster

Media
All Notre Dame games will air on WHPZ Pulse 96.9 FM. Games are streamed online live.

Rankings

Schedule and results

|-
!colspan=9 style=|Exhibition

|-
!colspan=9 style=| Regular season

|-
!colspan=9 style=| ACC Women's tournament
|-

|-
!colspan=9 style=| NCAA women's tournament

Source

References

Notre Dame Fighting Irish women's basketball seasons
Notre Dame
Notre Dame
NCAA Division I women's basketball tournament Final Four seasons
NCAA Division I women's basketball tournament championship seasons
Notre Dame Fighting Irish
Notre Dame Fighting Irish